Selaginella brisbanensis is a plant in the spikemoss family Selaginellaceae endemic to northeastern and southeastern Queensland.

Conservation
This species is listed by the Queensland Department of Environment and Science as least concern. , it has not been assessed by the IUCN.

Gallery

References

External links
 
 
 View a map of historical sightings of this species at the Australasian Virtual Herbarium
 View observations of this species on iNaturalist
 View images of this species on Flickriver

brisbanensis
Endemic flora of Queensland
Taxa named by Frederick Manson Bailey
Plants described in 1886